Lucy Tammam is a British fashion designer working with haute couture techniques and fair trade practices.

Personal life 

Born in Poole, Dorset, Tammam grew up in the coastal town before moving to London in 2000 to study fashion design with marketing at Central Saint Martins.

Accolades 

 2022 Winner Drapers Best Engagement Campaign Award 
 2013 On behalf of the Tammam label, Lucy Tammam received a Future 50 Award for demonstrating outstanding entrepreneurial flair and innovation in their pursuit to improve the economy, environment and society (awarded by  Striding Out)

References

British fashion designers
Living people
Date of birth missing (living people)
People from Poole
Alumni of Central Saint Martins
Year of birth missing (living people)